Gold is a 1932 American Pre-Code Western film directed by Otto Brower. An early sound B western, the film starred Jack Hoxie in the second of his six sound westerns, featuring Hooper Atchley as the villain Kramer.  The film also marked the last screen appearance of silent movie actress Alice Day.

The film is preserved in the Library of Congress collection, Packard Campus for Audio-Visual Conservation.

Plot
Kramer (Atchley) works the gold fields by buying up miners' claims and then having his henchmen murder them, taking both the money and the gold.  When cowboy-turned-prospector Jack Tarrant's (Hoxie) partner Jeff Sellers becomes the next victim to Kramer's scam, Tarrant decides to put an end to Kramer's gang once and for all.

Cast
Jack Hoxie as Jack Tarrant
Alice Day as Marion Sellers
Hooper Atchley as Kramer
Matthew Betz as Henchman Childress
Lafe McKee as Jeff Sellers
Jack Clifford as Elmer Sigmuller
Tom London as Sheriff
Bob Kortman as Henchman Without Mustache
 John Lowell as Bartender

References

External links

1932 films
American black-and-white films
1932 Western (genre) films
American Western (genre) films
Films directed by Otto Brower
Majestic Pictures films
1930s English-language films
1930s American films